Birmingham North may refer to:
 Birmingham North (European Parliament constituency)
 Birmingham North (UK Parliament constituency)

See also 
 North Birmingham